Leendert van Utrecht (born 25 February 1969 in Noordwijk) is a retired Dutch footballer who played as a forward for Noordwijk, SBV Excelsior, SC Cambuur, Padova and ADO Den Haag.

External links
  CV - Leonard van Utrecht
  Profile

Living people
1969 births
People from Noordwijk
Association football forwards
Dutch footballers
Dutch expatriate footballers
Excelsior Rotterdam players
SC Cambuur players
Calcio Padova players
ADO Den Haag players
Expatriate footballers in Italy
Dutch expatriate sportspeople in Italy
Eredivisie players
Eerste Divisie players
Serie A players
Serie B players
Footballers from South Holland